Remonce is a cake-filling paste used in various traditional Danish pastries. It is made by creaming softened butter with sugar, and is sometimes flavoured with cinnamon (e.g. in cinnamon snails), cardamom, custard, marzipan, or almond paste. Remonce is always baked along with the pastry.

Remonce is a Danish word and invention. In the English language it has been referred to as "Lord Mayor filling".

See also
 
 List of pastries
 List of butter dishes

References

External links
 Kvali Mad (Max): Remonce filling - Lord Mayor filling - for danish pastry, "brunsviger", cinnamon buns etc.  Various recipes, discussion and instructional Video. A private non-profit homepage from Denmark.

Danish pastries
Spreads (food)
Foods featuring butter